Eslamabad Gamasyab Sofla (also Romanized as Eslāmābād Gāmāsyāb Soflá; also known as Eslāmābād-e Soflá) is a village in Khaveh-ye Jonubi Rural District, in the Central District of Delfan County, Lorestan Province, Iran. At the 2006 census, its population was 94, in 21 families.

References 

Towns and villages in Delfan County